Union councils of Meherpur District are the smallest rural administrative and local government units in Meherpur District of Bangladesh. The district consists of two municipalities, 3 upazilas, 18 union porishods, and 285 villages.

Meherpur Sadar Upazila
Meherpur Sadar Upazila is divided into Meherpur Municipality and five union parishads. The union parishads are subdivided into 61 mauzas and 104 villages. Meherpur Municipality is subdivided into 9 wards and 72 mahallas.

 Kutubpur Union
 Buripota Union
 Amjhupi Union
 Amdah Union
 Pirojpur Union

Mujibnagar Upazila
Meherpur Sadar Upazila is divided into four union parishads. The union parishads are subdivided into 29 mauzas and 33 villages.

 Dariapur Union
 Monkhali Union
 Bagoan Union
 Mahajonpur Union

Gangni Upazila
Gangni Upazila is divided into Gangni Municipality and nine union parishads. The union parishads are subdivided into 90 mauzas and 137 villages. Gangni Municipality is subdivided into 9 wards and 29 mahallas.

 Kathuli Union
 Tetulbaria Union
 Kazipur Union
 Bamondi Union
 Monmura Union
 Sholotaka Union
 Saharbati Union
 Dhankhola Union
 Raypur Union

References 

Local government in Bangladesh